Korab is an Albanian surname or male given name. It derives from Mount Korab, the highest mountain in Albania. The name Korab may refer to:

Korab Syla (born 1992), American soccer player

See also
 Korab (surname)

References

Albanian masculine given names